Events in the year 2022 in Benin.

Incumbents 
 President – Patrice Talon
 Vice President – Mariam Chabi Talata
 National Assembly President – Louis Vlavonou
 Foreign Affairs Minister: Aurélien Agbénonci

Events 
Ongoing – COVID-19 pandemic in Benin

February 
 February 8 – Armed terrorists attack W National Park in the North of Benin. Of the eight people killed, five were park rangers, one was their French instructor, another a soldier, and the last an official. Ten people were injured.
 February 10 – Another African Parks official is killed after their vehicle hits a bomb planted by terrorists.

April 
 April 12 – Five soldiers are killed and several wounded when the army convoy struck an explosive device placed by suspected Islamist militants in Pendjari National Park, according to two military sources.
 April 22 – The International Monetary Fund (IMF) reaches a staff-level agreement on a new 42-month extended credit facility worth $658 million, according to the IMF.
 April 26
 At least one police officer is killed and several wounded in an attack on Monsey police station in Karimama. This attack is part of the spillover of militant activity from neighbouring Burkina Faso and Niger, according to two police sources.
 The Ministry of Islamic Affairs, Dawah and Guidance of Saudi Arabia begins implementing an iftar program, targeted 24,000 beneficiaries.
 April 27 – Dutch impact investor Oikocredit invests $1.4 million in solar mini-grid provider Weziza to implement a long-awaited rural electrification project.

Deaths 
 February 15 – Vivi l'internationale, singer (b. 1946)
 March 2 – Moussa Okanla, scholar and diplomat (b. 1950)
 May 29 – Osayuki Godwin Oshodin, academic administrator (b. 1950)
 December 17 – Soumanou Oke, military officer (b. 1955)

See also 

 COVID-19 pandemic in Africa
 2022 in West Africa

References 

2022 in Benin
2020s in Benin
Years of the 21st century in Benin
Benin
Benin